In theater, a brace is a sliding  piece of wood or metal with a 'butterfly' winged nut to make it longer or shorter to fit the flat used to stabilize a flat set piece such as a flat. The nut is used, so that it can be changed more quickly than a screw to the floor during a quick change. Usually, a brace is painted black to make it less noticeable to the audience. Braces are often used to form a triangle between two perpendicular items (like a vertical flat and a stage. They can also make a flat piece stronger by forming an X-shape between all four corners. Another way to brace a rectangular flat is to use special braces, called toggles which run at regular intervals, parallel to the short end of the flat, effectively breaking it into many smaller, stronger rectangles.

Stage terminology
Scenic design